Marcelito "Lito" Castro Pomoy (born September 22, 1984) is a Filipino singer, known for his ability to sing in both tenor and soprano. He is the grand winner of the second season of Pilipinas Got Talent. In 2019, he took part in America's Got Talent: The Champions finishing fourth overall.

Early life and career
Pomoy was born in Imus, Cavite and raised in Bislig, Surigao del Sur, both of which are in the Philippines.

When he was young, his father was incarcerated while his mother left him alone with his younger sibling and went to Manila. He was later adopted by a police officer and did odd jobs when he was a teenager. Later on, both his biological father and mother had separate families of their own.

Pomoy had discovered a talent of his while doing poultry work: singing in both a male tenor voice and a strikingly convincing female soprano voice. This paved the way for him to join different contests in both the amateur and professional leagues. He tried his luck in Talentadong Pinoy, but regrettably did not make it.

He later joined the second season of Pilipinas Got Talent (PGT), when he was 26 years old and by this time, made the cut. In the course of his PGT stint, he was able to fulfill his lifelong dream to reunite with his family.

Pomoy makes regular appearances on ASAP, and his first studio album, entitled Duet Yourself, was released in 2011 under Star Records.

In September 2018, he appeared on the Metro Manila radio station Wish 107.5, call sign DWNU performing Celine Dion and Andrea Bocelli's famous duet "The Prayer", a bilingual song in English and Italian. The station reinvited him to perform "The Power of Love" by Jennifer Rush, also made famous by Dion.

The performance on the Manila station caught the attention of the American television host Ellen DeGeneres. She invited him and his wife to appear on her show TheEllenShow. He performed two songs on the show, "The Prayer" and "Beauty and the Beast" gaining attention internationally because of the show. As Pomoy had picked both songs from Celine Dion mentioning that she was his favorite singer, Ellen arranged for Pomoy to go to Las Vegas to attend one of her concerts and meet her personally.

In August 2019, he appeared at the ASOP (A Song of Praise) Music Festival in its 7th edition singing Joel Jabelosa's "Pagbabalik". The festival was broadcast on Philippine television.

America's Got Talent: The Champions
Pomoy's success on PGT led to his being a contestant on the second season of America's Got Talent: The Champions.

He auditioned with "The Prayer" in episode 2 that aired January 13, 2020. Being qualified to the next round, he followed with singing the main soundtrack of "Beauty and the Beast". In the semi-finals, he performed "Con te partirò" in Italian. In the final he sang "We Are the Champions" from Queen with additional participation by other finalist acts Boogie Storm, Duo Transcend and Hans and Russian Bar.

He finished fourth in the competition overall.

Personal life 
On September 21, 2014, Pomoy married Joan Paraiso of Calauag, Quezon. They have one daughter, Marcella Janiah. Pomoy currently resides in his wife's hometown in Calauag together with his family.

Philanthropist 
Pomoy, who has hardware stores in Calauag, makes philanthropic activities in town. He has built small houses for some residents and helps organize donation drives for education and other sectors.

Discography

Studio albums

Filmography

Television

See also
 Pilipinas Got Talent (season 2)
 America's Got Talent: The Champions (season 2)
 Jovit Baldivino
 Maasinhon Trio
 Power Duo
 Kristel de Catalina

References

External links
Mars Pomoy on Facebook

1984 births
Living people
People from Surigao del Sur
People from Imus
21st-century Filipino male singers
Star Magic
Got Talent winners
Reality show winners
Pilipinas Got Talent contestants
Star Music artists